Kidder is a surname.  Notable people with the surname include:

 Alfred V. Kidder (1885–1963), American archaeologist
 Daniel Parish Kidder (1815–92), American theologian  
 Edward Kidder (1665/66–1739), 18th century pastry cook 
 Frederic Kidder (1804–85), American author  
 Hugh Kidder (1897–1918), officer in the United States Marine Corps during World War I
 Janet Kidder (born 1972), Canadian actress
 Jefferson P. Kidder (1815–1883), 19th century American lawyer, jurist, and politician
 Kathryn Kidder (1868–1930), American actress
 Margot Kidder (19482018), Canadian American actress
 Ray Kidder, American physicist and nuclear weapons designer
 Rushworth Kidder (1944–2012), founder of the Institute for Global Ethics
 Sarah Kidder (c.1839-1933), first female railroad president in the world
 Tracy Kidder (born 1945), American author